Keury Mella (born August 2, 1993) is a Dominican professional baseball pitcher for the Sultanes de Monterrey of the Mexican League. He previously played in Major League Baseball (MLB) for the Cincinnati Reds and Arizona Diamondbacks, and in the Chinese Professional Baseball League (CPBL) for the Uni-President Lions.

Career

San Francisco Giants
Mella signed with the San Francisco Giants organization as an international free agent on May 31, 2012. He made his professional debut in 2012 with the Dominican Summer League Giants, recording a 3-3 record and 2.47 ERA in 14 appearances. Mella played the 2013 season with the AZL Giants, logging a 3-2 record and 2.25 ERA in 10 games. He split the 2014 season between the Single-A Augusta GreenJackets and the Low-A Salem-Keizer Volcanoes, pitching to a cumulative 4-4 record and 3.45 ERA with 83 strikeouts in 86.0 innings of work. He was assigned to the High-A San Jose Giants to begin the 2015 season.

Cincinnati Reds
On July 30, 2015, the Giants traded Mella and Adam Duvall to the Cincinnati Reds in exchange for Mike Leake. He finished the year with the High-A Daytona Tortugas, logging a 3-1 record and 2.95 ERA in 4 games with the team. In 2016, Mella split the year between Daytona and the Triple-A Louisville Bats, posting a 9-9 record and 3.76 ERA with 101 strikeouts in 138.2 innings pitched.

The Reds added Mella to their 40-man roster after the 2016 season. He split the majority of the 2017 season between the Double-A Pensacola Blue Wahoos and Louisville, accumulating a 9-4 record and 3.00 ERA in 21 games. On September 12, 2017, Mella was promoted to the major leagues for the first time. He made his MLB debut on September 20, pitching 2.0 innings of 2-run ball against the St. Louis Cardinals. He finished his rookie season with a 6.75 ERA across 2 appearances for Cincinnati. In 2018, Mella spent the majority of the year in the minors, and pitched in 4 big league games for the Reds, stumbling to an 8.68 ERA in 4 games. Mella played in Louisville for the majority of the 2019 season, and allowed 3 runs in 3.2 innings of work in 2 major league games. On November 4, 2019, Mella was outrighted off of the 40-man roster and elected free agency.

Arizona Diamondbacks
On November 8, 2019, Mella signed a minor league contract with the Arizona Diamondbacks organization, and was invited to major league Spring Training. On September 1, 2020, the Diamondbacks selected Mella's contract to the active roster. In 11 games for the Diamondbacks in 2020, Mella pitched to a 1.80 ERA with 10 strikeouts over 10 innings pitched. On February 26, 2021, Mella was designated for assignment after the signing of Tyler Clippard was made official. On March 1, Mella was outrighted and invited to Spring Training as a non-roster invitee. After recording a 3.86 ERA in 11 games for the Triple-A Reno Aces to begin the year, Mella was selected to the active roster on June 15. In 2 games for Arizona, Mella struggled tremendously, allowing 6 earned runs in 1.2 innings to the tune of a 32.40 ERA. He was designated for assignment on June 18. On July 28, Mella was released by the Diamondbacks.

Pittsburgh Pirates
On August 3, Mella signed a minor league contract with the Pittsburgh Pirates. He was assigned to the Triple-A Indianapolis Indians. Mella made 16 appearances for the Triple-A Indianapolis Indians, going 2-0 with a 7.11 ERA and 23 strikeouts. On October 13, Mella elected free agency.

Uni-President Lions
On January 14, 2022, Mella signed with the Uni-President Lions of the Chinese Professional Baseball League. He posted a 2-8 record with a 4.26 ERA in 11 starts. Mella was not re-signed following the season and became a free agent.

Sultanes de Monterrey
On March 4, 2023, Mella signed with the Sultanes de Monterrey of the Mexican League.

References

External links

1993 births
Living people
Arizona Diamondbacks players
Arizona League Giants players
Augusta GreenJackets players
Cincinnati Reds players
Dominican Republic expatriate baseball players in Taiwan
Dominican Republic expatriate baseball players in the United States
Dominican Summer League Giants players
Daytona Tortugas players
Louisville Bats players
Major League Baseball pitchers
Major League Baseball players from the Dominican Republic
Pensacola Blue Wahoos players
People from Bonao
Reno Aces players
Salem-Keizer Volcanoes players
San Jose Giants players
Toros del Este players
Uni-President Lions players
Indianapolis Indians players